Congress Terminal was a rapid transit station on the Chicago "L", serving its South Side Elevated. It was located at Congress Parkway over Holden Court. The Loop's congestion issues led to the terminal's reopening in 1902, renamed Old Congress to distinguish it from the Congress/Wabash station.

Congress Terminal was built by the Chicago and South Side Rapid Transit Railroad and was one of Chicago's original 'L' stations. On August 1, 1949, the CTA stopped service to the terminal as part of the service revision introducing A-B Skip-Stop service to the south side. The Chicago North Shore and Milwaukee Railroad continued to use the station as a baggage terminal until the line quit in 1963.

Nomenclature
The name of the station was fluid over time. It was referred to as the "Congress street station" and "Congress street terminus" in 1892, and the "State–Congress terminal" upon its closing in 1949.

History

Opening and original use (1892–1897)

The South Side Elevated Railroad was incorporated in 1888, and commenced operations on June 6, 1892. Its northern terminus was a station on Congress Street that was a one-track and one-platform affair. The congestion at the terminal was such that the Chicago Tribune remarked that:

Loop and disuse (1897–1902)
The Loop opened, resulting in the closure of the Terminal.

Reuse and final days (1902–1963)
The Loop became overcrowded, so the old Congress terminal was reopened in 1902. To prevent confusion with the nearby Congress/Wabash station, it was renamed "Old Congress".

Station details
Throughout its existence, the terminal was a single-track operation with a platform on its eastern end.

Operations and connections
As originally opened, the South Side Elevated took 14 minutes to go between Congress and 39th streets, half the time the State Street cable car route took. Service was 24 hours, with trains run every 20 minutes between midnight and 5 a.m.; every 14 minutes between 5 a.m. and 7 a.m. and between 10 p.m. and midnight; every 6 minutes between 7 a.m. and 8:30 a.m., 9:30 a.m. to 4 p.m., and 6:30 p.m. to 10 p.m.; and every 3 minutes between 8:30 and 9:30 a.m. and 4 to 6:30 p.m. during rush hours.

References

External links
A narrated 1949 view of the Congress Terminal

Railway stations in the United States opened in 1892
Railway stations closed in 1963
1892 establishments in Illinois
1963 disestablishments in Illinois
Chicago "L" terminal stations
Former North Shore Line stations
Defunct Chicago "L" stations